Herman Fleischer Høst (12 November 1883 – 4 September 1980) was a Norwegian physician.

Biography
He was born at Frederikshald  (now Halden) in Østfold, Norway. He was the son of Jens Ludvig Høst (1814–1894) and Marie La Roche Fleischer (1853–1908). He graduated artium in 1903 from Kristiania Cathedral School. He graduated with the cand.med. degree in 1909 and took the dr.med. degree in 1917 both from the University of Kristiania. He worked at Bergen sykehus (now Haukeland University Hospital) in Bergen from 1916 to 1919 and in Kristiania from 1919. From 1924 to 1951 he was a chief physician at Bærum sykehus (now Vestre Viken Hospital Trust), residing at Høvik and Stabekk.

He is credited for introducing blood sugar tests in type 2 diabetes patients in Norway in 1916, the modern blood transfusion and blood type tests in Norway in 1919, as well as insulin treatment of diabetes patients in Norway. From 1936 to 1954 he was also the chief physician in the National Insurance Administration.

He was decorated with the Royal Norwegian Order of St. Olav.
He became blind at the age of 70. He lived to the age of 96 and was buried in Vår Frelsers gravlund.  He was married to Gudrun Rasmussen (1888–1976). They were the parents of Dr Herman Høst and  university professor Gerd Høst Heyerdahl (1915-2007).

References

1883 births
1980 deaths
People from Halden
People educated at Oslo Cathedral School
University of Oslo alumni
20th-century Norwegian physicians
Norwegian diabetologists
Norwegian blind people
Recipients of the St. Olav's Medal
Burials at the Cemetery of Our Saviour